Collège de Valleyfield is a College of general and vocational education (CEGEP) in Salaberry-de-Valleyfield, Quebec, Canada. It is located at 169 Champlain Street. It was established in 1896, and became public in 1967.

History 
In 1892, the mayor of Salaberry-de-Valleyfield, John H. Sullivan, began to work with his councillors to found a classical college.

In 1895, a building was erected to accommodate 27 students while awaiting construction on Champlain Street of the current Valleyfield College.

On September 5, 1896, Valleyfield College opened its doors.

In 1925, due to a law, Valleyfield College became the Valleyfield Seminary or the "St-Thomas d'Aquin Seminary". It was renamed Valleyfield College when it became public in August 1967. It is one of the twelve founding CEGEPs of the public college education system in Quebec.

External links
Collège de Valleyfield

References

Quebec CEGEP
Education in Montérégie
Buildings and structures in Montérégie
Educational institutions established in 1967
Salaberry-de-Valleyfield